Thomas Allan Bigelow (born October 31, 1939 in Whitewater, Wisconsin) is a former driver in the USAC and CART Championship Car series.

Racing career

Midget car racing
He began his racing career at the Badger Midget Racing Association at Angell Park Speedway in Sun Prairie, Wisconsin. His first attempt at the National Championship was in 1967, and he finished eighteenth. He had 1968 midget wins at Hales Corners Speedway in Hales Corners, Wisconsin and at the Sycamore, Illinois track. He won the first Astro Grand Prix in the Houston Astrodome in 1969. His come back in Midgets started in 1981 driving for Sandy Racing.

In 1984, he was National USAC Midget Champion. For two years in a row (1982 and 1983), he was USAC Spreedrome champion.

USAC/CART

He raced in USAC and CART in 17 seasons (1968–1983 and 1985), with 104 combined career starts, and started in the Indianapolis 500 every year during 1974 to 1982.  He finished in the top ten 39 times, with his best finish in second position in 1978 at Texas World Speedway and Milwaukee.

Bigelow started in nine straight Indianapolis 500 races between 1974 and 1982, his best finish was sixth in 1977.

Sprint car
Bigelow was the 1978 USAC Sprint Car Series Champion. He became the leader in USAC Sprint car single season wins with 14. Bigelow won 52 USAC Sprint Car races in his career.

Return to midget cars
He returned to his roots won the 1984 USAC National Midget Series Champion. He finished fourth, third, and ninth in the following three season. He also won the 1982 USAC Midwest Regional midget car title. His car (number 16) was owned by Carl Sandy, husband of Carol Sandy and father of Duane, Mathew, and Troy Sandy.

NASCAR
Bigelow made a single NASCAR start at the 1986 Atlanta Journal 500 at the Atlanta International Raceway, and he finished 40th with engine problems.

Career awards
He was a 2002 inductee in the National Midget Auto Racing Hall of Fame at his home track in Sun Prairie.
Bigelow was inducted in the National Sprint Car Hall of Fame in 1996.

Retirement
Starting in 2009, Bigelow was a color announcer for Fox Sports Network for Must See Racing Xtreme Sprint Series television coverage.

Motorsports career results

American open-wheel racing
(key) (Races in bold indicate pole position)

USAC Championship Car

PPG Indy Car World Series

Indianapolis 500

NASCAR
(key) (Bold – Pole position awarded by qualifying time. Italics – Pole position earned by points standings or practice time. * – Most laps led.)

Winston Cup Series

ARCA Bondo/Mar-Hyde Series
(key) (Bold – Pole position awarded by qualifying time. Italics – Pole position earned by points standings or practice time. * – Most laps led.)

References

1939 births
Champ Car drivers
Indianapolis 500 drivers
Living people
NASCAR drivers
National Sprint Car Hall of Fame inductees
People from Whitewater, Wisconsin
Racing drivers from Wisconsin
USAC Silver Crown Series drivers
Dale Coyne Racing drivers